Alberta Provincial Highway No. 947, commonly referred to as Highway 947, is a designated north-south highway in northern Alberta, Canada that is partially constructed. The constructed portion of the highway consists of the final  of the route from the Athabasca River to Highway 43.

Route description 
The constructed portion of Highway 947 begins at the north bank of the Athabasca River, which serves at the boundary between Woodlands County to the south and the Municipal District of Greenview No. 16 to the north. It is preceded by a bridge and a series of private resource roads that provides access to oil and gas facilities on the south side of the Athabasca River.

History

Original alignment 
Highway 947 was first designated in the early 1970s, but in a different alignment. At that time, the highway began at Highway 16 within Edson. It traveled northeast using the general alignment that is now designated Highway 748, and then north to Swan Hills via Whitecourt using the general alignment that is now designated Highway 32. From Swan Hills, it continued north to Highway 2 using the general alignment that is now designated Highway 33.

By the mid-1970s however, the portion of this original alignment of Highway 947 from Edson to present day Highway 32 was renumbered to Highway 748, while the balance of this original alignment to Highway 2 was renumbered to Highway 932.

Current alignment 
In the mid-1970s, after the original Highway 947 was renumbered to Highway 748 and Highway 932, the Highway 947 designation was applied to the current alignment of the highway from the Athabasca River to Highway 43. Previously at a gravel standard, this segment of the highway was paved in 2009.

The balance of this highway was planned by the Province of Alberta and identified as a future resource highway in the 1980s, but economic constraints prevented its construction.

Future 
Headed by Yellowhead County, the most recent lobby effort to construct the balance of Highway 947 began in late 2010. In early 2011, the lobby effort expanded to the Grande Alberta Economic Region, an alliance of 12 municipalities, to which the towns of Edson and Fox Creek have obliged. As part of its lobbying efforts, Yellowhead County has committed to constructing the first  of Highway 947 (Range Road 183) north Highway 16 to a paved standard with a scheduled completion of 2013. Alberta Transportation approached the Canadian Environmental Assessment Agency in 2014 to determine if a federal environmental assessment would be required to construct and operate the highway extension.

Major intersections 
The following is a list of existing and future major intersections along Highway 947 from south to north.

References

External links 
2015 Provincial Highways 500 - 986 Progress Chart by Alberta Transportation.

947